Victoria Nwayawu Nwosu-Hope (born 25 September 1989) is a British TV and radio presenter, journalist and published author.

Hope hosts three shows a week across BBC Radio 1, Going Home with Vick and Jordan alongside Jordan North, and Life Hacks and Official Chart: First Look alongside Katie Thistleton. Sunday Times dubbed Vick a 'voice of a generation' when she started at BBC Radio 1 in 2020.

Hope is passionate about literature and currently hosts the 2022 Women's Prize For Fiction podcast series after she was on the 2021 judging panel. In the summer of 2022, Vick hosted her own television show Vick Hope's Breakfast Show which aired across ITV every Sunday morning.

Hope previously hosted the Capital Breakfast show on Capital FM with Roman Kemp and Sonny Jay, Crufts on Channel 4, Carnage on Sky One, Trending Live on 4Music, and FYI Daily on ITV2. She was also a backstage presenter for ITV's The X Factor in 2019 after becoming the digital reporter for The Voice UK in 2018. In 2020, she became the red carpet host of 2020 BAFTA Film Awards. In October 2020, it was announced that Hope would host a new ITV Hub sister show entitled I'm a Celebrity...The Daily Drop.

As well as presenting, Hope has worked as a print and broadcast journalist for ITN and publications including The Argentina Independent and Marie Claire. In 2017 Hope won the Broadcasting Powerhouse Award at the Marie Claire Future Shapers Awards. She is a human rights activist and Amnesty International ambassador, having worked with the organisation since she was 16.

Early life 
Hope was born and raised in Newcastle upon Tyne by her English father, Nigel Hope, and Nigerian mother, Adeline Nwosu. She has three younger brothers. She studied modern languages at Emmanuel College, Cambridge, and can speak French, Spanish and Portuguese. Hope has spoken in interviews about teaching herself Spanish and taking night classes in Newcastle in extra A-Level subjects to win her place at Cambridge.

Her career began during her university "year abroad" in Buenos Aires, Argentina, where at 19 she became the youngest ever journalist employed by independent English-language expat newspaper The Argentina Independent, and it was while in Buenos Aires that she was picked up by MTV to present shows for them. Following that, she broke into the British television mainstream as a reporter and presenter.

Career

Radio 

From 2017–2020, Hope hosted the Capital Breakfast show in London along with Roman Kemp and Sonny Jay. Before this she hosted weekend breakfast on sister station, Capital Xtra. 

In 2019, Hope joined Classic FM presenting Classic FM's Revision Hour alongside Ellie Goulding, Lewis Capaldi & Dan Smith.

In August 2020, Hope replaced Cel Spellman to co-host Life Hacks and “Official Chart: First Look” alongside Katie Thistleton on BBC Radio 1.

In June 2021, it was announced that Hope will co-host BBC Radio 1's drivetime show Going Home with Vick and Jordan alongside Jordan North, beginning 6 September 2021.

Television 
During June and July 2022, Hope hosted her own television show 'Vick Hope's Breakfast Show' which aired across ITV every Sunday morning throughout the summer.

On 20 October 2020, it was announced that Hope would host 2 new ITV Hub shows entitled "HOW" and I'm a Celebrity...The Daily Drop, after the original spin off show, Extra Camp was axed after 17 years on air.

Hope and Kemp have also presented together on ITV2's 2Awesome and Can You Make It for Red Bull TV.

In 2020, Hope hosted the pre-show red carpet for BAFTA Film Awards. In the same year, Hope presented Channel 4's Crufts alongside Clare Balding. She co-hosted the BRIT Awards 2019 International Live Stream on YouTube with Todrick Hall.

Hope was the backstage presenter for ITV's The X Factor: Celebrity and The X Factor: The Band live final, after hosting The X Factor's spinoff show Xtra Bites.

As well as working as an entertainment reporter for ITV's Lorraine, Hope has presented programmes for Channel 4's 4Music channel since 2014, including Trending Live! with AJ Odudu and Jimmy Hill and interview shows Box Fresh, Face The Fans, HotBox and The Hangout, before which she worked on youth and music shows for Disney Channel UK, MTV, Capital Xtra and Vevo.

In 2018, Hope joined The Voice UK as their backstage reporter having worked for ITV on The Hot Desk (2016) and FYI Daily, where she continues to produce and present the showbiz news.

The same year, Hope was announced to front Sky One's Carnage alongside Freddie Flintoff and Lethal Bizzle. She went on to work further with Sky One and Sky Arts presenting their live coverage of Isle of Wight Festival alongside Edith Bowman and Joel Dommett.

On 27 October 2018, Hope was gunged on CBBC show Saturday Mash Up, after losing a vote.

In sport, Hope presented Yahoo Sports Presents Tailgate - a weekly show about American sports in 2019-2020 & Channel 4's World Chase Tag Parkour Championships in 2019.

She also presented cycling coverage of The London Nocturne for Channel 4, Sky Sports and Eurosport, and fronted three series of Street Velodrome for BT Sport. She partook in All Star Netball for BBC's Sport Relief 2019.

In news and factual programming, Hope continues to work as a news and entertainment reporter for ITN. The company also produced her first TV documentary The Slenderman Killings for Channel 5. In the documentary Hope investigated the rise of online horror, and it was named The Guardian newspaper's Pick Of The Day. Hope also presented the documentary That's Not Me, exploring the use of retouching in fashion photography, which won the BBC Award for Factual Entertainment at the Visions Film Festival.

In August 2018, it was announced that Hope would be a contestant on the 16th series of Strictly Come Dancing. She was paired with professional dancer, Graziano Di Prima and they were eliminated on 21 October, missing out on the Halloween special. Hope controversially criticised her Cha Cha dance exit, blaming judges and production crew for saving comedian Seann Walsh in the dance off. She was the fourth celebrity to leave the show.

In February 2022, Hope began co-presenting BBC's Britain's Best Young Artist with Kaiser Chiefs frontman and former art teacher Ricky Wilson.

On 12 June 2022, Hope presented the first episode of Vick Hope’s Breakfast Show; shown on Sunday mornings on ITV, it features celebrities, summer reading recommendations, and cocktail recipes.

On 13 December 2022, Channel 4 announced that Hope, would join Countdown's Dictionary Corner, which she renamed (via social media) "Vicktionary Corner" for the week.

Writing 
In 2020, Hope released her debut children's novel, Listen Up: Rule the Airwaves, Rule the School. She is set to publish the sequel later this year.

Hope writes for various publications including Marie Claire, Shout magazine, and New Teach.

Other 
Hope has worked as a live host for a multitude of events including Ru Paul's Drag Con UK, Great North Run, Capital's Summertime Ball, Capital's Jingle Bell Ball, and the 2023 Alpine F1 Team car launch.

In 2019, she hosted the Onside Awards at the Royal Albert Hall alongside HRH Prince Harry and Dev Griffin.

Awards 
Hope received a TRIC Award in 2019 and 2020 for Best Radio Show for Capital Breakfast. She also received a TRIC Award for Best Entertainment Show for Strictly Come Dancing in 2019.

Hope was nominated for Best Entertainment Programme at the BAFTA TV Awards 2019 for her work on Strictly Come Dancing.

In 2019, Hope was named "Woman Who Changed The Game" by Nike x Football Beyond Borders.

Hope was consecutively nominated for Favourite TV Personality at the NRTA s in 2018 and 2019.  In 2017 Hope won the Broadcasting Powerhouse Award at the Marie Claire Future Shapers Awards. She has also been nominated for an Urban Music Award for her Capital Xtra Weekend Breakfast show, and a Royal Television Society Award for her That's Not Me documentary. She won the BBC Award For Factual Entertainment for her documentary That's Not Me.

Personal life 
Hope is a human rights activist and Amnesty International Ambassador, and in 2018 hosted the Amnesty stage at the Women's March in London.  Hope also works closely with Choose Love (formerly Help Refugees) as an ambassador of their Choose Love campaign. She also works closely with Made By Sport - helping disadvantaged young people through sport, a charity she has been with since launching alongside Anthony Joshua and Prince Harry. In addition to her philanthropy work, Hope also volunteers at a weekly refugee project near her home in Hackney, London where she works with children from asylum seeking families.

Hope was previously in a relationship with Plebs actor Tom Rosenthal, which ended in November 2017.  As of May 2022, she is reportedly engaged to DJ Calvin Harris.

See also
 List of Strictly Come Dancing contestants

References

External links 
 
 Going Home with Vick and Jordan on Radio 1 (BBC Radio 1)
 Radio 1's Life Hacks (BBC Radio 1)
 The Official Chart: First Look on Radio 1 (BBC Radio 1)

1989 births
Living people
Capital (radio network)
BBC Radio 1 presenters
English radio DJs
English television presenters
Alumni of Emmanuel College, Cambridge
Writers from Tyne and Wear
Black British television personalities
English people of Nigerian descent
Black British radio presenters